Park Jong-hwan (born 7 September 1982) is a South Korean actor. He is best known for his role as Byeon Deuk-jong in the psychological thriller drama Hell Is Other People.

Personal life 
Park studied filmmaking at the Seoul Institute of the Arts after his military service.

Career

Filmography

Film

Television series

Awards and nominations

References

External links 
 Park Jong-hwan at Plum Actors 
 
 

1982 births
Living people
21st-century South Korean male actors
South Korean male television actors
South Korean male film actors